In Greek mythology, Sinope (Ancient Greek: Σινώπη) was one of the daughters of Asopus and thought to be an eponym of the city Sinope on the Black Sea.

Family 
Sinope's mother was Metope, daughter of the river-god Ladon. In one account, she was called the daughter of Ares and Parnassa or Aegina (usually her sister). In the account of her being the offspring of Ares, Sinope was probably one of the Amazons.

Mythology 
According to Corinna and Diodorus Siculus, Sinope was carried away by the god Apollo to the place where later stood the city honouring her name. Diodorus adds that she bore to Apollo a son named Syrus, supposedly afterwards king of the Syrians, who were named after him.

However, the Argonautica and Valerius Flaccus relate that Sinope was abducted to the site by Zeus, who, in his passion, swore to fulfil her dearest wish. Sinope declared she wished to remain a virgin. Sinope later tricked Apollo and the river Halys in the same fashion and remained a virgin all her life.

Notes

References 

 Apollonius Rhodius, Argonautica translated by Robert Cooper Seaton (1853-1915), R. C. Loeb Classical Library Volume 001. London, William Heinemann Ltd, 1912. Online version at the Topos Text Project.
 Apollonius Rhodius, Argonautica. George W. Mooney. London. Longmans, Green. 1912. Greek text available at the Perseus Digital Library.
 Diodorus Siculus, The Library of History translated by Charles Henry Oldfather. Twelve volumes. Loeb Classical Library. Cambridge, Massachusetts: Harvard University Press; London: William Heinemann, Ltd. 1989. Vol. 3. Books 4.59–8. Online version at Bill Thayer's Web Site
 Diodorus Siculus, Bibliotheca Historica. Vol 1-2. Immanel Bekker. Ludwig Dindorf. Friedrich Vogel. in aedibus B. G. Teubneri. Leipzig. 1888–1890. Greek text available at the Perseus Digital Library.
 Gaius Valerius Flaccus, Argonautica translated by Mozley, J H. Loeb Classical Library Volume 286. Cambridge, MA, Harvard University Press; London, William Heinemann Ltd. 1928. Online version at theio.com.
 Gaius Valerius Flaccus, Argonauticon. Otto Kramer. Leipzig. Teubner. 1913. Latin text available at the Perseus Digital Library.

External links 
 
 SINOPE on theoi.com

Naiads
Nymphs
Children of Asopus
Children of Ares
Women of Apollo
Anatolian characters in Greek mythology